PB-28 is an agonist of the sigma-2 receptor.

It is derived from cyclohexylpiperazine.

References

External links
 

Phenol ethers
Piperazines